Blade of Tyshalle is a science fantasy novel by American writer Matthew Stover,  set seven years after the events of its predecessor Heroes Die.  It is the second book in the ongoing Acts of Caine novel cycle.  Like Heroes Die, it focuses on Hari Michaelson and his struggles on Earth and Overworld.

Plot summary
Seven years after the events of Heroes Die, Hari Michaelson (also known as Caine) is a puppet executive on the Studio he used to work for.  He is now a paraplegic and lives with his wife Shanna and her daughter Faith.  He uncovers a plot by Earth's executives to infect Overworld with a plague of HRVP (an especially virulent form of rabies) that would clear the way for colonization of Earth's crowded population into the new world and an exploitation of its resources.  In addition to Michaelson the story also details a number of other characters, including Hari's academy friend Kris Hansen, the former Overworld god Tan'elKoth  (the former Ma'elKoth now exiled to Earth) and Raithe, a young Monastic adept obsessed with killing Caine.

2001 American novels
2001 science fiction novels
American science fiction novels
American fantasy novels
Del Rey books
Overpopulation fiction
Science fantasy novels
Novels about virtual reality
Dark fantasy novels
Dystopian novels